Ralph Hale Mottram FRSL (30 October 1883 – 16 April 1971) was an English writer. A lifelong resident of Norfolk, he was well known as a novelist, in particular for his "Spanish Farm trilogy", and as a poet of World War I.

Early life
Mottram was born in Norwich, Norfolk, the oldest son of James Mottram and his second wife, Fanny Ann (nee Hale). The Mottrams were non-conformist and worshipped at the Octagon Chapel in Colegate. He had an idyllic childhood growing up in Bank House, a magnificent George II mansion on Bank Plain, the headquarters of Gurney's Bank, later taken over by Barclays Bank (and now a youth centre). He was educated at the City of Norwich School and spent a summer improving his French at M. Rosselet's school in Lausanne, Switzerland. Mottram's father James was the chief clerk of Gurney's Bank, and was trustee of the marriage settlement of Ada Galsworthy, wife of novelist John Galsworthy. Ada encouraged the young Ralph Mottram to begin writing, and he published two slim volumes of poetry which appeared in 1907 and 1909 under the pseudonym of "J. Marjoram". He remained close friends of the Galsworthys and would later write personal portraits of them.

First World War
Mottram was posted to the Western Front with the 9th Norfolk Regiment, 6th Division British Expeditionary Force (BEF) in October 1915, where he took part in defending the Ypres Salient. After intermittent periods of hospitalisation, his proficiency in the French language earned him a position as a Divisional Claims Officer. Eventually he was assigned to the Claims Commission's HQ at Boulogne and was promoted to lieutenant; the post perhaps saved his life. In 1918 he married Margaret (Madge) Allan. They had two sons and a daughter and were married for over fifty years.

Career
Mottram went from being a bank clerk in Norwich before the war, to becoming Lord Mayor of the city in 1953, the year of the Queen's coronation. He had begun working at Gurney's Bank in December 1899, and after the war continued to work for them whilst writing in his spare time. The Spanish Farm, for which John Galsworthy had provided a preface, won the 1924 Hawthornden Prize. In 1927 it was made into a silent film entitled Roses of Picardy. The American author William Faulkner greatly admired The Spanish Farm trilogy, comparing it with Stephen Crane's The Red Badge of Courage for its insights into the reality of war. The scholar Max Putzel summarised this by stating: "Mottram had given Faulkner an example for dealing with war by indirection, understating or disguising the powerful emotions Crane had boldly undertaken to summon up". Mottram wrote the Galsworthy number for the National Book League's "Writers and their Work" series, and penned numerous books on the subjects of his home city, county and the wider region of East Anglia. During World War II he was a British Council representative to the United States Airforce division based in Norfolk. He worked with others towards the foundation of the University of East Anglia which opened in 1963, and which made him an honorary Doctor of Letters in 1966. As a conservationist, he was a defender of Mousehold Heath, a large open space in the heart of Norwich, and was a chairman of the Norwich Society. On St James' Hill overlooking the city, there is a memorial plinth dedicated to him, which depicts the skyline of Norwich.

Death
After his wife's death in 1970, Mottram moved to King's Lynn to live with his daughter and died the following year. He is buried in the non-denominational Rosary Cemetery, Norwich, where a headstone stands in memory of the couple and their three children. Being a non-member of the established Church of England, Mottram once said: "I knew, when I was four years old, exactly where I could be buried."

Works

References

Further reading
 Hugh Cecil, The Flower of Battle: British Fiction Writers of the First World War (Secker & Warburg, 1995); chapter 5.
 Gilbert Henry Fabes, The First Editions of Ralph Hale Mottram (Myers & Co., 1934); includes two essays and a short story by RHM.
 Rachel Young, A Mottram Miscellany (The Larks Press, 1997); letters written to the Mottram family, 1730-1900.

1883 births
1971 deaths
Writers from Norwich
British male poets
English male novelists
20th-century English poets
20th-century English novelists
20th-century English male writers
English World War I poets